Krasny Stroitel is an industrial and residential area in the city of Bishkek of Kyrgyzstan. It is part of the Sverdlov District.

References

Bishkek